FNG may refer to:

 F.N.G. (album), by American crossover thrash band Suicidal Tendencies
 Fanagalo, a pidgin of southern Africa
 Faridabad-NOIDA-Ghaziabad expressway, a planned expressway in India
 Farthest neighbor graph
 Foclóir Stairiúil na Nua-Ghaeilge, the Dictionary of Modern Irish
 Friends of New Germany, a defunct American pro-Nazi organization
 National Guarantees Fund, an agency of the government of Colombia
 Fox Networks Group
 Fucking New Guy, a derogatory term first used by the United States military during the Vietnam War
 Fight Nights Global, a Russian mixed martial arts organization